The RTÉ 2fm Breakfast Show is the flagship show on RTÉ 2fm. Since 31 May 2021, it has been hosted by Doireann Garrihy, Donncha O'Callaghan and Carl Mullan under the banner of 2FM Breakfast with Doireann, Donncha and Carl.

History

The first breakfast show presenter was Declan Meehan, who remained in the slot for just under five months. Marty Whelan took over from Meehan and has the distinction of hosting the breakfast show on four occasions. Ian Dempsey is the longest-serving breakfast show presenter, having hosted on two occasions for a total of ten years. Eoghan McDermott resigned from the show in March 2021, he was replaced in May 2021 by Doireann Garrihy, Carl Mullan and Donncha O'Callaghan.

Hosts

Stand-ins
Holiday cover has usually been provided by another prominent member of the RTÉ 2fm presentation team - rarely the job goes to an outsider. Additionally, transitions between regular hosts have often been bridged by stand-ins. These have been:

Following the sudden departure of Marty Whelan to the newly created Century Radio in April 1989, the breakfast show was fronted by Simon Young, Scott Williams and Maxi.
Paddy McKenna joined Jim-Jim Nugent as a replacement for Colm Hayes in May 2010, when the latter moved to co-host a new show during the former Gerry Ryan Show slot. After the permanent departure of Jim-Jim Nugent in September 2010, Paddy McKenna was joined as co-host of the breakfast show by Ruth Scott.
Alan Swann covered the period between the axing of Breakfast with Hector and the beginning of Breakfast Republic.
Stephen Byrne and Tara Stewart filled in for Doireann Garrihy between April and May 2021 while she workshopped a new show following Eoghan McDermott's departure.

Notes

References

Irish breakfast radio shows
RTÉ 2fm programmes